Fatima Jinnah Park, also known as Capital Park or F-9 Park, is a public recreational park that spans the whole of Sector F-9 of Islamabad, Pakistan. It is named after Mādar-e Millat Fatima Jinnah, the younger sister of the founder of Pakistan Muhammad Ali Jinnah. 

At , it is just smaller than New York's Central Park. It was designed by Michael Japero, and was inaugurated in 1992. The park’s original master plan was prepared by the Japan International Cooperation Agency, and was revised in 2005 by Pakistani architect Nayyar Ali Dada.

Fatima Jinnah Park's vast acreage is mostly covered by greenery, with a few man-made structures dotting the landscape. Most of the park area is effectively a wildlife sanctuary, except for a few areas of the park that are close to residential districts. The park is bounded by a steel fence with entrance doors placed at regular intervals, although only a few are routinely open and used. A further strip of land outside of the fence is lined with a footpath. A well laid network of footpaths lies inside the park, with neat grass and a few statues.

Layout 

Since the park is bounded by a steel fence on all four sides, entrance is possible only through the gates, at least one of which is present on each side.

 Gate 1: Mehran Gate, located on the southern side on Jinnah Avenue, facing sector G-9
 Gate 2: Bolan Gate, located on the western side, facing sector F-10
 Gate 3: Khyber Gate, located on the northern side, facing sector E-9
 Gate 4: Ravi Gate, located on the eastern side, facing sector F-8
 Gate 5: Located on the eastern side, leads to the Citizen Club Mass Vaccination Centre

A network of jogging tracks connects the abovementioned gates. Moreover, there is a mosque, parking lot, and public toilets at every entrance.

Public use 
Only a few areas of Fatima Jinnah Park are man-made, containing busy clusters of buildings, while other areas rarely see human activity. The park's open spaces are commonly used for recreational walking and outdoor sports. Occasionally, they are used for driving lessons. The following man-made buildings are located inside the park:

Leisure Arena 
Originally known as Mega Zone, this complex was renovated and inaugurated as Leisure Arena on 21 December 2019. It includes a sports zone with a standard-length swimming pool, a gym, and tables for table tennis and snooker. The complex also includes facilities for bowling, arcade games, laser tag, and other games; areas for fast food and dining; and an assortment of shops for clothes, DVDs, and other items.

McDonald's 
The Supreme Court of Pakistan ordered a McDonald's fast-food restaurant and several clubs, such as an Aeromodelling Club, that had been operating inside F-9 Park to close down. However, these establishments are still operational as of 2023.

Solar power plant 
In 2017, F-9 Park converted to solar energy with 3,400 solar panels installed on an area of around five acres inside the  park at a cost of $4.8 million. Funds for the project were provided by the Chinese government as a grant. These panels generate about 0.85 megawatts (850 kW) of power and have a back-up facility to provide energy to street lights. The system runs water pumps and sprinkler systems for the park, and provides power for the offices of the Metropolitan Corporation Islamabad and Capital Development Authority, both located within the park.

Mass vaccination centre 
In May 2021, a mass coronavirus vaccination centre was opened in the Citizen Club building inside the park. The facility has 75 counters, and can inoculate 7,000 people daily. Moreover, in June 2021, a drive-through vaccination centre was opened in the park in collaboration with Ministry of Health, Capital Development Authority, and the Bank of Punjab.

Illegal logging 
Over the past few years, the lack of repairs to the south-eastern side of the fence has enabled illegal cutting and transportation of trees.

Future plans 

The Capital Development Authority (CDA), which manages the park, has grand plans for the space, which is sometimes called the "sleeping heart" of Islamabad. The issue of the park's development is more pressing now that the people of Islamabad have taken a keen interest in recreational activities. The CDA's proposed future design for the park will include lakes, rock gardens, aquariums, and fountains.

Gallery

See also 
 List of parks and gardens in Pakistan
 List of parks and gardens in Lahore
 List of parks and gardens in Karachi

References 

Parks in Pakistan
Tourist attractions in Islamabad